Karl Gustaf Larson (5 June 1873 – 2 December 1948), better known as Larin-Kyösti, was a Finnish poet. Many of his poems have been set to music by Yrjö Kilpinen or by Jean Sibelius (e.g. Kaiutar, op. 72 no. 4).

Biography
Larson was born at Hämeenlinna, Finland. His  parents, Gustaf Israel Larson and Sofia Vilhelmina Skog, were both born in Sweden. 
His father, who operated a restaurant, committed suicide in 1884.
Larson started a course of study  at the University of Helsinki in 1895. 
In 1897 he published his first collection of poems, derived from Finnish folk life and nature. 
Larin-Kyösti's depression was often reflected in his writing. 
In 1906, he attempted suicide on his way to Italy and was sent to a mental hospital in Florence.  He remained a lifetime bachelor.
In 1912, he established a residence at Oulunkylä,  a suburb and a neighbourhood of Helsinki  where he lived for the rest of his life.  He died in Oulunkylä during 1948.
He was buried next to his parents at the   Hämeenlinna Cemetery.

References

External links
Biography at Runeberg.org in an old Finnish biography

Finnish male poets
1873 births
1948 deaths
20th-century Finnish poets
20th-century male writers
19th-century Finnish poets
19th-century male writers
People from Hämeenlinna